Kimama is an populated place in Lincoln County, Idaho, United States. Kimama is located on State Highway 24 between Deitrich and Minidoka.

There is a Bureau of Land Management (Twin Falls District) fire station in Kimama.

Kimama is about 3 miles north of a volcanic hill called The Crater, and about 7 miles northeast of the larger volcanic butte called Kimama Butte.  The Shale Butte Wilderness Study Area is north of Kimama.

References

Populated places in Lincoln County, Idaho